Former French secret service chief Paul Paillole was born in the Breton town of Rennes on 18 November 1905. He died on 15 October 2002 in the Bichat hospital in Paris. He is remembered essentially for his role organizing the arrest of German intelligence agents in France after the defeat of 1940 but his activity during this period has been the subject of controversy.

Background

Paillole’s father died in action in 1918 during the First World War. This personal loss seems to have instilled in Paillole a strong sense of patriotism which both his admirers and his critics acknowledge. Following the death of his father his mother took up a post as a school teacher in Marseille.  Here the young Paillole attended the Lycée Saint Charles.  A keen sportsman he later claimed that he played soccer for the prestigious Olympique de Marseille football club although this does not appear to have left any traces in the official records of the club.

Military career

Guided by both his sense of patriotism and his love of physical activity Paillole joined the French army in 1925 and was promoted to Lieutenant in 1929. In 1935, Paillole was transferred to the Secret Services. He was initially reluctant to accept this posting as he considered the job too desk-bound and started with very limited knowledge of the workings of the Secret Services. But rapidly he excelled at the job earning a reputation for professional competence. At the outbreak of the war Paillole was a prominent member of the active counter-espionage branch, the 5th Bureau (not to be confused with the 2nd Bureau which was the more administrative branch of secret service activity).

Wartime activity

After France was rapidly defeated in 1940, the newly established Vichy regime decided to reorganize its espionage and counter-espionage services. Paillole took control of a clandestine counter-espionage network which operated from Marseille under the codename ‘Travaux Ruraux’ (TR- ‘Rural Works’). Recent research by the British historian Simon Kitson has shown that contrary to the version presented by secret service veterans this network was not operating in opposition to the Vichy government.  Vichy officials were informed from November 1940 of the location of the headquarters of this network and the arrest of German agents as a result of TR  activity was actively supported by the structures of the official state: police, prisons, courts, armistice commissions. Although Vichy itself was collaborating extensively with the German forces occupying Northern France, Vichy leaders were keen to preserve their autonomy and to centralize collaboration. The work of Paillole’s services served to defend sovereignty and to prevent unauthorised individual acts of collaboration on the part of ordinary French citizens.

There is no doubting that Paillole’s services took their counter-espionage role seriously. Kitson has estimated that around 2000 individuals were arrested by the collaborating French State on charges of spying for Vichy’s diplomatic partner: Germany. However, between 1940 and 1942 the position of the secret services was extremely ambiguous as regards the Allies. In their postwar presentation of this attitude secret service veterans have always presented themselves as firmly in the Allied camp and engaged from the outset in Resistance.  Recently historians have been unearthing a more complicated picture where Paillole was actively involved in the arrest of Resisters and Allied agents. Paillole provided Vichy with information about Resistance leader Jean Moulin and documentation which allowed Vichy police to destroy the ‘Azur’ Resistance network in Marseille in October 1941.
Kitson has also presented documentation showing that Paillole told associates in 1942 that although Germany was ‘enemy number one’ Britain was ‘enemy number two’. Trusted by Vichy, Paillole was appointed as head of a new clandestine counter-espionage structure, the Service de Sécurité Militaire, established by Pierre Laval and Admiral Darlan in August 1942. Nevertheless, during this same 2-year period, 1940–1942, Paillole also did provide a limited amount of information to the Allies and offered help to those Resisters personally known to himself, such as Henri Frenay.
 
When the Germans invaded the previously unoccupied southern part of France in November 1942, Paillole felt compelled to flee to Allied-controlled North Africa. After that he adopted a much more clear-cut pro-Allied stance which would see him rewarded in the post-war period with medals and commendations for Resistance from the British, Americans and Poles. However, he still did not entirely shed his previous political attachment to Vichy. Rather than opting to follow Charles de Gaulle after November 1942 Paillole chose to throw in his lot with de Gaulle’s rival, General Henri Giraud. Giraud’s position on domestic policy issues was very similar to Vichy’s. In November 1943, the British Foreign Office reported that Paillole was allegedly involved in an intrigue to help Marshal Philippe Pétain escape from France so that he might be given the leadership of the French forces in exile. De Gaulle was said to be incensed and ordered the total subordination of Paillole’s services to the secret services operating directly for the Gaullists.

Postwar career

After the war Paillole devoted much energy to defending the reputation of his services trying to show that they were pro-Allied from the outset and engaged in unambiguous Resistance. In 1953, he set up a secret service veterans’ association, the Amicale des Anciens des Services Spéciaux de la Défense Nationale, which published a regularly bulletin relating acts of counter-espionage heroism during the occupation. Paillole also donated a personal collection of archives to the historical archives service of the army, the Service Historique de l’Armée de Terre (SHAT), although Kitson has suggested that this collection has been purged of virtually all reference to the anti-Allied activity of the counter-espionage service. Whilst other archival sources were in short supply Paillole’s representation of events was accepted unquestioningly by some historians. Indeed, the historian Philip John Stead, whose account of counter-espionage during the occupation period owed much to Paillole, even made a virtue of donating the royalties of his book to Paillole’s veterans’ association.  As archives about the period have become more available a more critical eye has been cast on Paillole’s version. The publication of Paillole’s memoirs in 1975 infuriated some resisters such as Toussaint Raffini, who had suffered arrest as a result of information made available to the Vichy police by the Travaux Ruraux network.

Paillole retired to the Parisian suburb of La Queue-lez-Yvelines, of which he served as mayor between 1965 and 1983.

References

Further reading

Paillole, Paul: The Spy in Hitler's Inner Circle (Oxford: Casemate UK, 2016) 

Paillole, Paul: Fighting the Nazis: Memoirs of the only French officer in on the secrets of D-Day (New York: Enigma Books, 2003) 

1905 births
2002 deaths
Military personnel from Rennes